Stanislav Krejčík (born 2 September 1972) is a retired Czech football midfielder.

References

1972 births
Living people
Czech footballers
Dukla Prague footballers
AFK Atlantic Lázně Bohdaneč players
MFK Chrudim players
FK Chmel Blšany players
FK Baník Most players
FK Pardubice players
SKU Amstetten players
Association football midfielders
Czech First League players
Czech expatriate footballers
Expatriate footballers in Austria
Czech expatriate sportspeople in Austria
Czech Republic women's national football team managers